Leandro Padovani Celin (born 21 December 1983) is a retired Brazilian football defender.

Club career
Padovani has spent the majority of his career in Brazil. In 2012, he transferred to Foolad in the Iranian Premier League where he won the title in 2013–14 season. In July 2014 Padovani signed with Naft Tehran.

Sepahan
He signed a contract with Iranian champions Sepahan in the summer of 2015, due to ITC issues he could not play until winter 2016. He made his debut on 2 February 2016 in a 2–2 draw against Persepolis.

Esteghlal
On 5 September 2016 he signed with Esteghlal. He started his first match against F.C. Mashhad on 15 November.

In March 2018 during a league match against Foolad he injured severely after an accidental encounter with his teammate Armin Sohrabian causing him to break his skull and neck. He got discharged from the hospital two month later on a wheelchair to start his physiotherapy and other treatments while staying at home. In November, Esteghlal's chairman Amir Hossein Fathi announced that Padovani would retire from playing football and will go to Brazil for his further treatments after being unable to fully walk during his 9-month period of physiotherapy. He also added that he would come back to Iran after his treatments to start his job, as club's assistant coach.

His doctor later reported that Padovani had lost the ability to walk forever and was paralyzed from the waist down.

Club statistics

Honours

Club
Foolad
Iran Pro League (1): 2013–14

Esteghlal
Hazfi Cup (1): 2017–18

Individual
Iran Pro League Team of the Year: 2014–15

References

External links

 Persianleague Profile
 

1983 births
Living people
People from Castelo, Espírito Santo
Brazilian footballers
Brazilian expatriate footballers
Persian Gulf Pro League players
Brasiliense Futebol Clube players
Sociedade Esportiva do Gama players
Foolad FC players
Naft Tehran F.C. players
Esteghlal F.C. players
Expatriate footballers in Iran
Volta Redonda FC players
Association football defenders
Sportspeople from Espírito Santo